John Sheedy (born 1959) is an Irish retired hurler who played as a goalkeeper with the Tipperary senior team.

Born in Portroe, County Tipperary, Sheedy first arrived on the inter-county scene at the age of seventeen when he first linked up with the Tipperary minor team, before later joining the under-21 hurling and junior teams. He made his senior debut during the 1983 championship. Sheedy enjoyed a brief career with Tipperary, however, he enjoyed little success.

At club level Sheedy enjoyed a lengthy career with Portroe.

His brother, Liam Sheedy, also played with Tipperary and is an All-Ireland-winning manager.

Throughout his inter-county career, Sheedy made 7 championship appearances for Tipperary. His retirement came following the conclusion of the 1985 championship.

In retirement from playing Sheedy became involved in team management and coaching. He has served as a selector with the Tipperary minor and intermediate team, while he has also been involved as a coach with club side Portroe.

Honours

Team

Tipperary
All-Ireland Junior Hurling Championship (1): 1989
Munster Junior Hurling Championship (1): 1988, 1989
All-Ireland Under-21 Hurling Championship (1): 1979 (sub), 1980 (sub)
Munster Under-21 Hurling Championship (1): 1979 (sub), 1980 (sub)

References

1959 births
Living people
Portroe hurlers
Tipperary inter-county hurlers
Hurling managers
Hurling selectors
Hurling goalkeepers